Alin Mircea Savu (born 29 November 1977 in Râmnicu Vâlcea) is a former Romanian football player.

External links
 

1977 births
Living people
Romanian footballers
Romanian expatriate footballers
Liga I players
Cypriot First Division players
FC Universitatea Cluj players
AFC Rocar București players
CS Inter Gaz București players
CSM Reșița players
Digenis Akritas Morphou FC players
FC Rapid București players
FC Politehnica Iași (1945) players
FC Petrolul Ploiești players
SCM Râmnicu Vâlcea players
Expatriate footballers in Cyprus
Romanian expatriate sportspeople in Cyprus
Association football midfielders
Sportspeople from Râmnicu Vâlcea